The 214th Infantry Division was a German division in World War II. It was formed on 26 August 1939.

Orders of Battle

214. Infanterie-Division 1939

Infanterie-Regiment 355
Infanterie-Regiment 367
Infanterie-Regiment 388
Artillerie-Regiment 214
Pionier-Battalion 214
Panzerabwehr-Abteilung 214
Aufklärungs-Abteilung 214
Infanterie-Divisions-Nachrichten-Abteilung 214
Infanterie-Divisions-Nachschubführer 214

214. Infanterie-Division 1943
Grenadier-Regiment 355
Grenadier-Regiment 367
Grenadier-Regiment 568
Divisions-Füsilier-Battalion 214
Artillerie-Regiment 214
Pionier-Battalion 214
Panzerjäger-Abteilung 214
Infanterie-Divisions-Nachrichten-Abteilung 214
Infanterie-Divisions-Nachschubführer 214

Commanding officers
Generalleutnant Theodor Groppe, 1 September 1939 – 30 January 1940
Generalleutnant Max Horn, 30 January 1940 – 31 December 1943
Generalmajor Carl Wahle, 31 December 1943 – 15 February 1944
Generalleutnant Max Horn, 15 February 1944 – 28 March 1944
Generalleutnant Harry von Kirchbach, 28 March 1944 – January 1945

External links

Infantry divisions of Germany during World War II
Military units and formations established in 1939
1939 establishments in Germany
Military units and formations disestablished in 1945